The Music Pioneer Awards was a Chinese music awards show produced by Music FM Radio Guangdong and other 23 Chinese provincial-level music radios. The first awards ceremony was held in 1987, and the event was last held in 2016.

Categories 

 Top 10 Songs – Mainland China
 Top 10 Songs – Hong Kong/Taiwan
 Top 5 Most Popular Male Singers
 Top 5 Most Popular Female Singers
 Most Popular Male Singer – Mainland China
 Most Popular Female Singer – Mainland China
 Most Popular Male Singer – Hong Kong/Taiwan
 Most Popular Female Singer – Hong Kong/Taiwan
 Best New Artist
 Most Potential New Artist – Mainland China
 Most Potential New Artist – Hong Kong/Taiwan
 Best New Group
 Best Group
 DJ Singer
 PengPeng.com Most Popular Male Singer
 PengPeng.com Most Popular Female Singer
 PengPeng.com Most Popular Group
 PengPeng.com Most Popular Song
 Best Performance
 Best Stage Performance
 Most Popular Collaboration
 Dance Music Award
 Best Original Song
 Best Lyrics
 Best Composition
 Best Music Arrangement
 Best Album
 Most Improved Award
 Most Film/Television Singer
 Best Film/Television Improved Award
 Best Songwriter
 Best New Songwriter
 Best Male Singer – Mainland China
 Best Female Singer – Mainland China
 Best Male Singer– Mainland China
 Best Female Singer– Mainland China
 Most Popular Singer
 Best Crossover Award
 Media Award
 Diamond Award
 Music King Award

References 

1987 establishments in China
Annual events in China
Awards established in 1987
Chinese music awards
Recurring events established in 1987